Min Kyung-hoon (born October 6, 1984) is a South Korean singer and television personality. He is the lead vocalist of the rock band Buzz and one-half of the duo Universe Cowards with Kim Hee-chul. His first solo album, Im·pres·sive, was released on December 5, 2007. His second solo album, Picnic, was released on June 27, 2011. He is a regular cast member of South Korean variety show Knowing Brothers (JTBC) and Problem Child in the House (KBS).

Career

Audition-related and trainee days
During his early childhood, Min never thought that he would become an entertainer. Once he entered high school, he worked  with a group of peers who liked to sing. While continuing to sing and perform, Min realized that being a singer who sang in a café next to the Han River suited him better than becoming a famous celebrity. In his third year of high school, Min was recommended to audition for an entertainment company as he was famous among students for both his strong vocals and "flower boy" visuals.

Min went to the audition for AYON Entertainment along with a friend without thinking seriously about it. He auditioned for the company, which would later become Buzz's first agency, in a karaoke room. Once the company heard him sing, they liked him and wanted to immediately sign a contract with him. Min would then record songs under this  agency and become a singer.

He signed a contract with a company in late spring 2002 and gave up on both sports and school to focus on singing. Min joined Buzz in June 2002 as the group's vocalist. The band's members practiced instruments together for two years. Min, having been added to the band later, often had to stay up at night and practice his vocals without rest.

2003-2007: Buzz activity days

Buzz made their official debut with "Morning Of Buzz" on October 11, 2003. Their second studio album "Effect" included songs like "Coward", "Thorn", and "Travel to Me" that gained extreme popularity. In their third album "Perfect", the song "You Don't Know Men" was well received. He was given the nickname "Ssamja" because he made a mistake singing this song. On May 17, 2007, Buzz disbanded temporarily as the members, with the exception of Min, began their mandatory military service. Min was confirmed to continue solo activities while the members are serving the military. On June 25, 2007, Buzz released the single "Love Is My Heart, Part 2".

2007-2014: Solo activity and Military life
On December 4, 2007, Min released his first solo album "Im · pres · sive", with the advice of Buzz members and the solicitation of his former agency. The album received a lukewarm reception. On December 12, 2008, he released the digital single, "Day", which was also not received very well. Until 2009, Min and Buzz took a hiatus. During this time, Min hardly left his house and suffered from severe depression and weight gain. He claims that during this "slump", he drank alcohol as soon as he woke up, and drank again to fall asleep.

Min was able to get back on his feet and return to music thanks to help from a fellow acquaintance. On February 4, 2010, the mini album "Reunion" was announced officially. The title song "I Love You" is one of his most popular solo songs. Min released the digital single "It's Alright" on March 29, 2010 and the soap opera My Life Is Beautiful OST "My Eternal Love", but there was no follow-up activity. In October and November 2010, he participated as a guest vocalist by singing his digital single "Wounded" and "Buzz 2" album "Fuzz-Buzz".

On June 27, 2011, Min released his 2nd solo album "Picnic". The album had many new attempts, including fast tempo and lively songs, a change from rock ballads, a genre Min is known for. However, controversies involving artists from the same company, namely Shin Jung-hwan's gambling in the Philippines, and MC Mong's military enlistment evasion had an adverse effect on the album promotion. The controversies lead to existing fans leaving the fandom, resulting in lower album sales compared to the previous album.

On March 6, 2012, after the release of his digital single "Look Back" on March 2, Min suddenly began his military service. He joined the Uijeongbu 306 supporters and served for 21 months. While Min was serving in the military band, he performed military band performances and concert train performances. Min finished his military service on December 5, 2013, and fans and Buzz members gathered and congratulated him.

2014-present: Buzz re-union, Knowing Bros and Universal Cowards
On April 8, 2014, Min returned as the singer of Buzz as the band announced their comeback.

In December 2015, he joined JTBC's new variety show, Knowing Bros, as a cast member. Fellow cast members include comedians Kang Ho-dong and Lee Soo-geun and Super Junior member Kim Hee-chul. Min's unique personality, a persona that was fresh in Korean entertainment at the time, enabled him to see a resurgence of popularity.

In fall 2016, Min and Kim Hee-chul released a duet titled "Sweet Dream". The two stars are known as "Universe Cowards" when they promote their music. The song proved successful, topping the South Korean Gaon Digital Chart, an achievement known as an "all-kill". In 2017, "Sweet Dream" won the Best Rock Song award at the MelOn Music Awards.

Following the success of "Sweet Dream", in February 2018, Universe Cowards returned with "Falling Blossoms". It was composed by Lee Sang-joon and Cha Jil-won and features lyrics written by Min, and peaked at number 15 on Gaon Digital Chart. Billboard described it as "soft pop-rock tune that grows to a soaring, emotional cacophony" and complimented how their music video was one of the most inclusive music videos South Korea's seen in some time.

Starting from November 2018, Min became a fixed cast member of the weekly variety show Problem Child in House after successful pilot episodes.

In December 2020, Universal Cowards collaborated with producer DinDin and Bibi to produce the traditional hip-hop track 'Hanryang'

Discography

Studio albums

Extended plays

Singles

Soundtrack appearances

Filmography

Television

Awards and nominations

References

External links

1984 births
Living people
South Korean pop rock singers
South Korean television personalities
Kyung Hee University alumni
Yeoheung Min clan
Melon Music Award winners
21st-century South Korean male singers